Ahlerstedt is a municipality in the District of Stade, Lower Saxony, Germany.

It belonged to the Prince-Archbishopric of Bremen. In 1648, the Prince-Archbishopric was transformed into the Duchy of Bremen, which was first ruled in personal union by the Swedish and from 1715 on by the Hanoverian Crown. In 1823 the Duchy was abolished and its territory became part of the Stade Region.

Local council 
The local council has 17 members, according to the 2016 elections:

 FWG: 11 seats
 CDU: 3 seats
 SPD: 2 seats
 NPD: 1 seats

References

Stade (district)